Dale Santon  (born 18 August 1969) is a former South African rugby union player.

Playing career
Santon played for the Western Province Sacos Schools team in 1986 and made his senior provincial debut for Western Province in 1993. In 1996 he joined the Boland Cavaliers and played 120 games over a seven-year period, scoring 33 tries for the union. In 1996, Santon was also selected for the South African A team, a feat he achieved again in 2001.

He also had two stints in Super Rugby, both with the Bulls. His first event was during the 1998 and 1999 seasons, when he played ten games and then again in 2003 and 2004.

Santon toured with the Springboks during the end of the year tour to Europe in 1997 and played in one tour game. He made his test debut for the Springboks during the 2003 Tri Nations, as a replacement for Danie Coetzee against Australia at Newlands in Cape Town. Santon was also a member of the South African squad for the 2003 Rugby World Cup that was held in Australia and played in the test against Georgia during the Pool stages of the tournament. He played in four test matches for the Springboks.

Test history

See also
List of South Africa national rugby union players

References

1969 births
Living people
Cape Coloureds
South African rugby union players
South Africa international rugby union players
Boland Cavaliers players
Western Province (rugby union) players
SWD Eagles players
Rugby union players from Cape Town
Rugby union hookers